The Five Fingers Group (also known as The Five Fingers) is a group of summits on the divide between Pitt Lake and Coquitlam Lake and north of Widgeon Lake, in British Columbia, Canada. The nearest populated areas are Anmore and Coquitlam. The peaks, all part of the same massif, are named for the fingers of a hand, but none of the names are official.

The area is extremely remote and inaccessible.  Its slopes on the Coquitlam River drainage are a major watershed and on that side, access is forbidden.

The peaks are:
 Middle Finger (mountain) , the highest
 The Thumb (mountain)  
 The Forefinger (mountain)  
 Little Finger (mountain)

Notes

References

 
 
 
 
 

Mountains of the Lower Mainland
Pacific Ranges
One-thousanders of British Columbia
New Westminster Land District